Marcel Van Der Auwera (24 August 1923 – 1 May 2008) was a Belgian fencer. He competed at the 1952, 1956 and 1960 Summer Olympics.

References

External links
 

1923 births
2008 deaths
Belgian male fencers
Belgian sabre fencers
Olympic fencers of Belgium
Fencers at the 1952 Summer Olympics
Fencers at the 1956 Summer Olympics
Fencers at the 1960 Summer Olympics
People from Tubize
Sportspeople from Walloon Brabant